The 1st Division was a formation of the Home Fleet of the Royal Navy. It briefly existed before the First World War from 1909 to 1912.

History
In March 1909 following a Navy re-organisation, the Home Fleet absorbed the Channel Fleet, which became its First and Second divisions. Each division consisted of A battle squadron that had eight ships. This was essentially a reserve force allocated to major home commands. The new Dreadnought class battleships were allocated to the 1st Battle Squadron - 1st Division, Home Fleet. The Royal Navy's  Battle Cruisers were posted to the 1st Cruiser Squadron. The Atlantic Fleet managed to survive the organisational changes. The first division existed until 1912 when it re-styled 1st Battle Squadron.

Rear-Admirals in the 1st Division
Post holders included:

Components
Included

Footnotes

References
 Friedman, Norman (2014). Fighting the Great War at Sea: Strategy, Tactic and Technology. Seaforth Publishing. .
 Mackie, Gordon. "Royal Navy Senior Appointments from 1865" (PDF). gulabin.com. Gordon Mackie, p.199. December 2017.

 Smith, Gordon. "Royal Navy Organisation and Ship Deployments 1900-1914". www.naval-history.net. Gordon Smith, 8 August 2015.

Royal Navy divisions
Military units and formations established in 1909
Military units and formations disestablished in 1912